Baldwin Wallace University (BW) is a private university in Berea, Ohio. It was founded in 1845 as Baldwin Institute by Methodist businessman John Baldwin. The school merged with nearby German Wallace College in 1913 to become Baldwin-Wallace College.

BW has two campus sites: Berea, which serves as the main campus, and BW at Corporate College East in Warrensville Heights. Today BW enrolls around 3,050 full-time undergraduate students, 800 evening and weekend adult learners, and 830 graduate students. BW recruits students throughout Ohio but also students from all over the United States and internationally. Baldwin Wallace's motto is "Creating contributing, compassionate citizens of an increasingly global society." Baldwin Wallace's athletic teams compete as members of NCAA Division III athletics in the Ohio Athletic Conference.

BW is known for its education, business, neuroscience, and music programs. BW is home to the Riemenschneider-Bach Institute and the Baldwin Wallace Conservatory of Music. The BW Conservatory holds the title for the oldest collegiate Bach Festival in the nation. The college's radio station WBWC is known throughout the Cleveland area.

History

Both the university and the town of Berea were founded by Methodist settlers from Connecticut. These settlers moved west after their homes were burned by the British in the Revolutionary War. The region in Northern Ohio became known as the Western Reserve (a part of which was designated the Firelands, as the state of Connecticut gave land grants to these fire victims). Among early settlers of this area was John Baldwin. Baldwin enjoyed early success in the sandstone quarry industry. He eventually founded Baldwin Institute in 1845. Baldwin Institute became Baldwin University in 1856. Baldwin's sense of equality led to the school accepting any student regardless of race or gender, and was one of the first in the nation to do so. Moreover, Baldwin University's courses were not segregated. The surge of German workers in Baldwin's sandstone quarries led to the establishment of a German department at the institute. 

The Reverend Jacob Rothweiler, a professor at Baldwin University, named his project after James Wallace, and German Wallace College was founded in 1855. Students at both institutions were free to enroll in courses at Baldwin or German Wallace. Baldwin and Wallace were the primary benefactors to the two Berea colleges. After their deaths, and the decline of the quarry industry in Ohio, Baldwin University came close to financial ruin. Options were thin, and the United Methodist Church considered merging the schools with the more successful Ohio Wesleyan University in 1874, to form the University of Cleveland. The University of Cleveland concept was abandoned for a more elegant solution. Baldwin University and German Wallace College merged in 1913 to form Baldwin–Wallace College.

The college's present day campus can be much accredited to the leadership of Alfred Bryan Bonds; through much of the mid-20th century, Baldwin Wallace grew to be a large and well respected suburban institution. Bonds oversaw the construction of fifteen buildings on campus during his 26-year tenure. Neal Malicky's tenure as college president stabilized the college's finances and endowment, finally placing Baldwin Wallace in financial security after years of financial struggle. Following Malicky's presidency, Mark Collier served as president for seven years, overseeing a campus master plan that has led to many major renovations on campus. In recent years the college has expanded and renovated residence halls and academic buildings. In addition, the college has purchased existing buildings in the Berea community for academic and student residential use.

In the fall of 2011, a task force was developed by BW President Dick Durst. On February 11, 2012, it was announced that Baldwin–Wallace College would become Baldwin Wallace University after approval by the BW Board of Trustees. The name would become effective on July 1 of 2012, with complete implementation by the end of 2012. In addition to the new university designation, seal, and logo, "B-W" would drop the hyphen in its name.

In recent years, BW has been a stopping point for political candidates.  During the 2008 Presidential campaign, BW hosted eventual President Barack Obama and 2008 Presidential candidate John McCain. In 2012 BW hosted vice presidential candidate Paul Ryan along with Condoleezza Rice.  The last sitting president prior to Obama to visit BW was Ronald Reagan during George H. W. Bush's 1988 Presidential run. The 2016 Presidential campaign resulted in visits from Bernie Sanders and BW hosting Ohio Governor John Kasich's Ohio Presidential Primary election night party.

In 2019, BW trustees voted to disaffiliate from the United Methodist Church after 174 years.

Academics

Baldwin Wallace offers more than 80 majors, as well as several cooperative and pre-professional programs. Evening and weekend programs include 12 majors and six certificate programs. For undergraduate programs, these majors lead to one of the degrees Bachelor of Arts, Bachelor of Science, Bachelor of Science in Education, Bachelor of Music, Bachelor of Music in Education, or Bachelor of Science in Nursing. Beyond this, BW offers 16 master's programs that lead to one of the degrees Master of Arts in Education or Master of Business Administration. BW offers programs and some courses online. BW has 201 full-time faculty, 80% of whom have doctorates or other terminal degrees.

The college maintains 27 academic departments leading to a bachelor's degree. In addition to on-campus study, students also have the opportunity to broaden their horizons through a number of off-campus study programs. Liberal arts remain at the center of the academic program, but they are augmented by opportunities to explore career options and develop professional skills. BW is well known in the midwest for its education, business, and sustainability programs. BW is also nationally recognized for the neuroscience undergraduate program and for the Conservatory of Music.

Conservatory of Music

The Baldwin Wallace Conservatory of Music is part of Baldwin Wallace University. The main building of the conservatory is Kulas Hall. The Conservatory holds the title of home to the oldest collegiate Bach Festival in the nation. The Conservatory of Music covers the discipline of music study, creation, performance and pedagogy.

BW at Corporate College East
Beyond the main campus in Berea, Baldwin Wallace offers classes at Corporate College East, a division of Cuyahoga Community College in Warrensville Heights, Ohio. The site focuses on the educational needs of working adults and their employers, enrolling students in undergraduate, graduate and executive education courses.

International programs
Baldwin Wallace has several international programs in which eligible upperclassmen are able to participate. The college operates several of its own programs plus international student exchange programs at Kansai Gaidai University (Japan), Christ University (India) and Ewha University (Korea), University of the Sunshine Coast (Australia), University of Osnabrück (Germany), York St John University (England), University of Hull (England), Webster University Vienna (Austria), Semester at Sea, and many more. BW has faculty-led trips yearly to places such as Europe, Iceland, India, Italy, Ecuador and China. As well, the college offers domestic U.S. - themed trips such as following The Lewis and Clark trail.

Outreach programs
BW uses programs such as Upward Bound and BW Scholars to reach and serve students from the Cleveland Metropolitan School District.  The BW Scholars program was formerly called "The Barbara Byrd-Bennett Program", named after Barbara Byrd-Bennett, who established and funded the program until her departure from the Cleveland Municipal School District. Barbara Byrd-Bennett was the first chief executive officer of the Cleveland Municipal School District. Today the BW Scholars Program continues under funding by the college. BW also utilizes opportunities in the Greater Cleveland for Service-learning. Service-learning is a method of teaching that provides opportunities for students to learn and develop through thoughtfully organized service experience.

Campus

The campus is located in Berea, Ohio, a suburb of Cleveland, Ohio. The campus is built around land that originally was two separate schools that combined in 1913. The campus itself is located next to Berea-Midpark High School and is integrated into the neighborhoods of Berea.  The majority of the Campus that exists today was expanded in the 1960s and 1970s. BW prides itself on its many green spaces around campus, such as the North Quad where residence halls, Ritter Library, and academic buildings surround a large field with sidewalks. Buildings that surround the quad include Malicky Center, Wheeler Hall, The Life & Earth Science building, the Center for Innovation and Growth, the Observatory, the President's house, several residence halls and the Alumni Wall. During the presidency of Alfred Bryan Bonds, the Alumni Wall (located behind North Hall) was created to recognize alumni who have contributed to the development of the campus. The North Quad is also home to a diverse tree collection, a Greenhouse, a native Ohio plants garden and a commons area (located behind Lang Hall). In 2009, BW opened the Thomas Family Center for Science and Innovation. The project connected the Life & Earth Science building and Wilker Hall.  On the south end of campus, BW has several green spaces such as Klein Field and Bonds Field. The campus is also situated next to Coe Lake (located behind the Townhouse Apartments).

South Campus Historic District

Part of the BW campus is in the National Register of Historic Places. This area is called Baldwin–Wallace College South Campus Historic District, and incorporates several buildings in the vicinity of Marting Hall.  It combined the former Lyceum Village Square and German Wallace College.

North Campus Historic District

In 2012, BW moved to propose the preservation of several historic buildings on its north part of campus. The North Campus Historic District The buildings include Baldwin Memorial Library & Carnegie Science Hall (Malicky Center for Social Sciences), Wheeler Hall (Recitation Hall), Wilker Hall, Telfer Hall, Ward Hall, Burrell Observatory, the Alumni House/President's House, the Tudor House, North Hall, Findley Hall, Lang Hall and Ritter Library.

Sustainability

BW has been first in several areas in sustainability. In 2005, BW became the first to have a residence hall in Ohio with geo-thermal heating and cooling. Ernsthausen Hall which was originally built in 1961 was renovated in 2005 to use geo-thermal heating and cooling. In the fall of 2008, Baldwin Wallace became the first college in Ohio to offer a bachelor's degree in sustainability. The undergraduate program offers four tracks in science, social sciences/humanities, business administration and quantitative analysis. In the fall of 2009, BW became the first school in the state to install a wind turbine on its campus. BW also uses kitchen grease from Strosacker Hall's dining facilities for the production of bio-diesel fuel for campus vehicles. In 2012, BW opened Harding House which is a renovated residence hall to become a "sustainability house". The house has an "energy dashboard" that monitors energy consumption and a vegetative roof garden that absorbs rainwater that helps regulate the building's temperature. In addition, Harding House and the Center for Innovation and Growth both have solar panels on their roofs. 63 Beech, 21 Beech, Saylor and Klien Halls will eventually join Ernsthausen & Harding House to also include Geo-thermal heating and cooling.

Student life

The Strosacker Student Union houses the campus's largest dining facility, The Student Life Center (campus life offices), various administrative offices, student organization offices, meeting rooms, the Cyber Cafe and the campus bookstore. The Student Activity Center (SAC), renovated in the late 1990s, was the women's gym in the 1930s, and today is used for concerts and various student events.

Housing

There are two locations where students are housed. The first is north campus which encompasses halls north of Bagley Road. North campus includes Lang, Findley, North and Hamilton Apartments. The college acquired a former practice field and office building when the team was moved to Baltimore. Findley Hall and Lang Hall both house typically upperclassmen students, but  North Hall usually houses first-year students. Lang Hall was the only all-female residence hall until 2008.

South campus typically encompasses residence halls that are south of Bagley Road. Davidson Commons makes up the new freshman complex. 21 Beech is also home to Honors housing. Ernsthausen, Heritage, and Constitution typically house upperclassmen and Greek organizations. Greek organizations are housed in residence halls because there are no fraternity/sorority houses. Kohler Hall, the Carmel Center for Living and Learning (referred to as Carmel Hall) and the Berea Townhouses are also located on the southern end of campus. Ernsthausen Hall is the first campus residence hall in Ohio to utilize geothermal power.

Davidson Commons opened during the 2013–14 academic year. It combines Davidson, Klein and Saylor halls, all of which were renovated with suite-styled dorm rooms, each consisting of either two or three bedrooms and a single shared bathroom.

Kohler Hall, originally  a hospital for Civil War veterans and later for mental patients, is located right beside the conservatory and mostly housed conservatory students, before it was abandoned and slated to be demolished in 2018.

BW also has several on-campus apartments which include Floreske, Hamilton House, and The Berea Townhouses, which all house upperclassmen and international MBA students. Also, Baldwin Wallace offers on-campus houses for student groups and upperclassmen.

Student organizations

Baldwin Wallace has over 100 clubs and organizations. Baldwin Wallace offers organizations for many of the academic majors at the college. Some of the organizations on campus include Student Government (that budgets approximately 80 of the organizations on campus), Midnight Madness, Campus Entertainment Productions, Commuter Activity Board, and Night On The Town. The campus has diversity groups such as Allies (an LBGT related organization), Middle-Eastern Culture Club (MECC), Hispanic-American Student Association, Black Student Alliance and Native American Student Association.

The BW campus has five fraternities, five sororities and numerous honoraries. BW fraternities and sororities are all housed in residence halls. Most are housed in Heritage Hall and some in Constitution. In the past, Greek organizations have been housed in halls such as North Hall and Ernsthausen. Greek Life organizations do not have on-campus houses due to fraternity and sorority houses being banned by the City of Berea in the 1960s. Beyond fraternities and sororities, the college has over 25 honor societies for academics and areas of involvement.

Campus Media

Although Baldwin Wallace does not offer a Journalism major (just classes), the campus does have student media. The longest running and official campus newspaper is The Exponent.  Exponent Campus Media oversees two papers, "Buzz!" and "The Exponent". The college has two student-run magazines, The Maelstrom and The Mill. The Maelstrom is a satirical magazine that has been known to poke fun at campus issues. The Mill is BW's annual literary and art magazine; it showcases the creativity of the entire student body.

The campus offers student opportunities in the area of television and radio. BuzzTV allows students to produce short movies and shows that air locally. BW also has a radio station WBWC 88.3 FM. The radio station has student DJ's who run radio shows. Many of the students are broadcast majors. WBWC first signed on in 1958 as the first totally student funded and operated radio station in the United States.

Athletics

BW's school colors are officially brown and gold, though in the past they adopted burgundy and teal as well as maroon and gold for their marketing literature.

The school's varsity sports teams are the Baldwin Wallace Yellow Jackets. They participate in the NCAA's Division III and the Ohio Athletic Conference. The university has long rivalries with John Carroll Blue Streaks and Mount Union Purple Raiders.

Lou Higgins Center is home to the physical education department, athletics, and recreational sports and services. The Lou Higgins Center was renovated and expanded in 2005. Beyond Varsity Athletics, Baldwin Wallace offers club sports, Intramurals, Aerobic Classes, a Fitness Center and Weight Room. Higgins Center is home to many of the athletic offices, along with Bagley Hall. Bagley Hall was originally owned by the Cleveland Browns and was used as the team's summer training facility. After the Browns left for Baltimore, the university converted the facility into a residence hall.  In 2012, Bagley Hall was converted into athletic offices.

Baldwin Wallace's football team was coached by Lee Tressel, who led the team to an undefeated record in 1978, and subsequently the NCAA Division III Championship. In 2008, the athletic turf on George Finnie Stadium was renovated and named "Tressel Field" in honor of the Tressel Family.

Perhaps the most notable BW athlete from the 20th century was Harrison Dillard, the only male so far to win Olympic titles in both sprinting and hurdling events, in the 1948 Summer Olympics. The teams of the Sidney High School Yellow Jackets were named after Baldwin Wallace graduate Granville Robinson became Head Coach at Sidney High School.

In 2009, after almost 20 years of use, BW adopted a new logo and modified the mascot for the athletic teams.

Notable people and alumni

References

External links

 Official website
 Official athletics website
Encyclopedia of Baldwin Wallace University History

 
Private universities and colleges in Ohio
Educational institutions established in 1845
Educational institutions established in 1913
Universities and colleges in Cuyahoga County, Ohio
Liberal arts colleges at universities in the United States
1845 establishments in Ohio
Liberal arts colleges in Ohio